The 2019–20 season is Gillingham's 127th season in their existence and seventh consecutive season in League One. Along with League One, the club are also participating in the FA Cup, EFL Cup and EFL Trophy. The season covers the period from 1 July 2019 to 30 June 2020.

Transfers

Transfers in

Loans in

Loans out

Transfers out

Pre-season
The Gills announced their pre-season programme on 18 June 2019.

Competitions

League One

League table

Results summary

Matches
On Thursday, 20 June 2019, the EFL League One fixtures were revealed.

FA Cup

The first round draw was made on 21 October 2019. The second round draw was made live on 11 November from Chichester City's stadium, Oaklands Park. The third round draw was made live on BBC Two from Etihad Stadium, Micah Richards and Tony Adams conducted the draw.

EFL Cup

The first round draw was made on 20 June.

EFL Trophy

On 9 July 2019, the pre-determined group stage draw was announced with Invited clubs to be drawn on 12 July 2019.

References

Gillingham F.C. seasons
Gillingham